Čitluk is a village in Serbia. It is situated in the Mali Zvornik municipality, in the Mačva District of Central Serbia. The population of the village is 238 (2002 census), all of which are Serbs.

Historical population

1948: 371
1953: 412
1961: 370
1971: 333
1981: 285
1991: 277
2002: 238

See also
List of places in Serbia

References

Populated places in Mačva District